La venganza, Spanish for "the vengeance", may refer to:
La venganza (1977 telenovela), a 1977 Spanish-language telenovela broadcast in Mexico
La Venganza (2002 telenovela), a 2002 Spanish-language telenovela initially broadcast in the U.S.
La venganza (film), a 1958 film directed by Juan Antonio Bardem
La venganza (1999 film), an Argentine film

See also
Venganza (disambiguation)